

Outdoor sculptures

 African Elephant (1982)
 Alexander Hodge Memorial
 Atropos Key (1972), Miller Outdoor Theatre
 Beer Can House
 Broken Obelisk, Rothko Chapel
 Brownie (1905), Houston Zoo
 Bygones (1976), Menil Collection
 Cancer, There Is Hope (1990)
 Charlotte Allen Fountain
 Charmstone (sculpture), Menil Collection
 Cloud Column (2006), Glassell School of Art
 George H. W. Bush Monument
 Inversion
 Isolated Mass/Circumflex (Number 2)
 Lillian Schnitzer Fountain (1875), Hermann Park
 Monument au Fantôme, Discovery Green
 Oliver Twist
 The Orange Show
 Pioneer Memorial (1936), Hermann Park
 Points of View (1991), Market Square Park
 Radiant Fountains
 Scanlan Fountain
 Sam Houston Monument, Hermann Park
 Spirit of the Confederacy, Sam Houston Park
 Statue of Christopher Columbus (1992), Bell Park
 Statue of George H. Hermann
 Statue of Richard W. Dowling (1905), Hermann Park
 Tolerance
 Virtuoso, Downtown Houston
 World War I Monument
 World War II Memorial

Lillie and Hugh Roy Cullen Sculpture Garden

The following works have been displayed at the Lillie and Hugh Roy Cullen Sculpture Garden:

 Adam
 Arch Falls
 The Back Series
 Big Twist
 Conversation with the Wind
 The Crab
 Cybele
 The Dance
 Decanter
 Exhaling Pearls
 Flora, Nude
 Gymnast II
 Houston Triptych
 The Large Horse
 Large Standing Woman I
 New Forms
 The Pilgrim
 Quarantania I
 Recuerdo de Machu Picchu 3 (Las terrazas)
 The Sound of Night
 The Spirit of Eternal Repose
 Two Circle Sentinel
 The Walking Man
 Untitled (Shapiro, 1990)

McGovern Centennial Gardens 

The following works are installed at McGovern Centennial Gardens:

 Benito Juárez
 Bust of Álvar Núñez Cabeza de Vaca
 Bust of Bernardo O'Higgins
 Bust of José Martí
 Bust of José Rizal
 Bust of Ramón Castilla
 Bust of Robert Burns
 Bust of Vicente Rocafuerte
 Dawn (1971)
 Statue of Confucius (2009)
 Statue of José de San Martín
 Statue of Mahatma Gandhi (2004)
  Statue of Martin Luther King Jr.
 Statue of Simón Bolívar

Public art
Houston
 
Public art in Texas
Tourist attractions in Houston